The Best FIFA Goalkeeper is an association football award presented annually by the sport's governing body, FIFA, to the world's best men's and women's goalkeeper.

The Best FIFA Men's Goalkeeper Award winners

The Best FIFA Women's Goalkeeper Award winners

References

See also
 The Best FIFA Football Awards
 The Best FIFA Men's Player

Goalkeepers
FIFA
Association football player non-biographical articles
Awards established in 2017